International Telegram or iTelegram provides telegram, mailgram and telex service. In the United States, iTelegram still operates the telex service which, until 2006, was marketed under the Western Union brand. It acquired the Western Union telegram and Telex businesses following Western Union's bankruptcy proceedings in 1991.

In 2002 it acquired the telegram unit from Canadian company Allstream Inc. and renamed it Telegrams Canada.

As of March 2019, the company maintains telegram services in around 180 countries.

References

External links

Companies based in Los Angeles County, California
Telecommunications companies of the United States
Telegraph companies
Telegraph companies of the United States